Dennis Melander (born 19 January 1983) is a Swedish footballer. He plays for Trelleborgs FF in Allsvenskan.

External links 
 

1983 births
Sweden under-21 international footballers
Trelleborgs FF players
Swedish footballers
Living people
Association football defenders
People from Trelleborg
Footballers from Skåne County